{{DISPLAYTITLE:C12H12}}

The molecular formula C12H12 may refer to one of many molecules, including:
Dodecaheptaene, a straight-chain polyene
Cyclododecahexaene ([12]annulene)
Cyclododecatriyne
[6]Radialene(hexaradialene)
Ten dimethylnaphthalene isomers, including 2,6-dimethylnaphthalene
Two ethylnapthalene isomers
17 dimethylazulene isomers
Five ethylazulene isomers
Trivinylbenzene
Tricyclobutabenzene
[6]Prismane (hexaprismane)